The Canadian territory of Nunavut covers about 1.9 million square kilometres (733,594 sq. miles) of land and water including part of the mainland, most of the Arctic islands, and all of the islands in Hudson Bay, James Bay, and Ungava Bay (including the Belcher Islands) which belonged to the Northwest Territories. This makes it the fifth largest country subdivision in the world. If Nunavut were a country, it would rank 13th in area, after the Democratic Republic of the Congo. Nunavut has land borders with Manitoba, the Northwest Territories on several islands as well as the mainland, and a tiny land border with Newfoundland and Labrador on Killiniq Island.

Physical geography

The mountains on the easternmost coasts of Nunavut are part of the Arctic Cordillera which stretches from northernmost Ellesmere Island to the northernmost tip of Labrador.
The highest point is Barbeau Peak which offers some of the world's most spectacular scenery.

Geologically, Nunavut lies on the Canadian Shield, with very thin soil lying on top of the bedrock, and many bare outcrops. The multitude of rivers and lakes in the entire region is caused by the watersheds of the area being so young and in a state of sorting themselves out with the added effect of post-glacial rebound. Virtually all of Nunavut's rivers drain into the Hudson Bay or the Arctic Ocean.

Arctic tundra (Köppen climate classification ET) covers virtually all of Nunavut, the only exceptions being the area roughly between the Four Corners and Ennadai and Nueltin Lakes, where a marginal taiga forest exists, and small zones of permanent ice caps, found on some of the larger Arctic Islands (especially Baffin, Devon and Ellesmere) at sites having a relatively high elevation. Nunavut's vegetation is partially composed of rare berries, lichens, Arctic Willows, moss, tough grass, and small willow shrubs.

Climate and climate data

Nunavut experiences a polar climate in most regions, owing to its high latitude and lower continental summertime influence than areas to the west. In more southerly continental areas, very cold subarctic climates can be found, due to July being slightly milder than the required .

Notes:

Demographics

, Nunavut has a population of approximately 34,000. In 2006 around 84% of the population were native peoples, primarily Inuit. Nunavut's small and sparse population makes it unlikely the territory will be granted provincial status in the foreseeable future, although this may change if the Yukon, which is only marginally more populous, becomes a province.

Gallery

References